Eoophyla assegaia is a moth in the family Crambidae. It was described by Wolfram Mey in 2011. It is found in South Africa.

References

Eoophyla
Moths described in 2011